The VII SS Panzer Corps was an armoured corps of the Waffen-SS of Nazi Germany which never took part in hostilities. On 30 June 1944, the corps was merged into the IV SS Panzer Corps.

History
The headquarters of the VII SS Armored Corps were established on 3 October 1943 in the training camp in Morhange (north-eastern France). The new corps was intended to include the 10th SS Panzer Division Frundsberg and the 17th SS Panzergrenadier Division Götz von Berlichingen. Both divisions were still in training.

At the end of December 1943, SS-Gruppenführer Matthias Kleinheisterkamp was commissioned to lead the corps, but in February 1944 he was also given command of the III (Germanic) SS Panzer Corps. Without the presence of a commander, staff personnel were transferred to other units. In February 1944, the staff only consisted of 1 officer and 1 non-commissioned officer. In March 1944, the 10th SS Panzer Division was relocated to the Eastern front. After the Allied landings in Normandy, the 17th SS Panzergrenadier Division was added to the 7th Army.

In May 1944, Kleinheisterkamp returned to the corps and was formally appointed commander. He restarted building the staff, but on 30 June 1944 the staff was merged with the IV SS Armored Corps, also led by Kleinheisterkamp.

Corps commanders
 May 25, 1944 - June 30, 1944: SS-Obergruppenfuhrer Matthias Kleinheisterkamp

Sources
 This is a translation of an article in the Dutch Wikipedia, VII SS Korps.

Waffen-SS corps
Military units and formations established in 1943
Military units and formations disestablished in 1944